Ford LTD may refer to:
Ford LTD (Australia), a full-size car manufactured by Ford Australia from 1973 to 2007
Ford LTD (Americas), an automobile produced by the Ford Motor Company in North America from 1965 through 1986